The GWR 6100 Class is a class of 2-6-2T side tank steam locomotives.

History
The class was designed by Charles Collett and introduced in 1931, and were a straightforward development of the earlier 5101 class (and for that matter the 1905 3100/5100 class).

There were seventy in the class, built in two batches in 1931–1933 and 1935. They were frequently referred to by trainspotters as 'Tanner One-ers' – being a reference to their '61xx' numbering sequence using colloquial terms for a sixpence and a penny.

The class was specifically built for commuter services in the London area where they replaced the ageing 2221 class on these services.  They lasted to the end of steam on the Western Region of British Railways in 1965, never straying far from their home turf.  Typical duties were Paddington to Aylesbury via High Wycombe, and from the same terminus to Oxford, Windsor, Reading and Basingstoke.  They were mainly shedded at Old Oak Common, Southall, Slough, Reading and Aylesbury throughout their lives.  In the early 1960s, the advent of the first generation diesel multiple units made them semi-redundant though generally far from worn out. Their last few years saw them on more menial duties, as in the adjacent photograph, until scrapping.

Preservation

One locomotive, 6106, has survived into preservation, and is at Didcot Railway Centre, though currently non-operational.

Model railways
The erstwhile Kitmaster company produced an unpowered polystyrene injection moulded model kit for OO gauge. In late 1962, the Kitmaster brand was sold by its parent company (Rosebud Dolls) to Airfix, who transferred the moulding tools to their own factory; they re-introduced some of the former Kitmaster range, including this model. The tools were subsequently sold again to Dapol who have also produced this model. Mainline Railways had OO gauge Class 6100 models in their catalogue in 1983, with models in GWR green and BR lined green. Dapol announced in 2017 that it was producing a completely new OO gauge model of the class. Hornby Railways is also retooling their OO gauge model of this class.

For some time Graham Farish have produced a British N gauge model, it is dated compared with more modern models and its driving wheels are scale for the 3100 class, i.e. 5 feet 3 inches, but is still a reasonable representation which forms a good base to add detail to.

Triang also produced a powered model of 6157 in TT scale.

See also
GWR 3100/5100 Class (1906)
GWR 3150 Class
GWR 5101 Class
 GWR 3100 Class (1938)
GWR 8100 Class
List of GWR standard classes with two outside cylinders

References

External links 

 Class 6100 Details at Rail UK

6100
2-6-2T locomotives
Railway locomotives introduced in 1931
Standard gauge steam locomotives of Great Britain
1′C1′ h2t locomotives
Passenger locomotives